Rockford is the fifteenth studio album by Cheap Trick, released on June 6, 2006 by Big3. The album's title refers to Rockford, Illinois, the band's hometown.

Background
Rockford was Cheap Trick's second album to be released through Big3 Records, following 2003's Special One. The album, which was released in June 2006, spawned three singles, "Perfect Stranger", "Come On, Come On, Come On" and "If It Takes a Lifetime". "Perfect Stranger", was produced by Linda Perry and co-written by Cheap Trick and Perry. Rockford peaked at number 101 on the Billboard 200. It also reached number 84 on the Japan Album Chart.

Speaking to Martin Popoff of Classic Rock Revisited, Rick Nielsen spoke of the album's recording process, which was carried out during touring commitments: "This one wasn't done like, you know, we're going to make an album. We didn't sit down and block off one month in one place. We did it over a year. We mixed it all at one time, but we recorded it... well, just look at the credits: L.A., New York, Boston, Rockford, Chicago, Nashville, Florida. So that's really it. I think the longest we were in one spot was maybe a week. It's not like, if you get stuck, and something is not working, you're sitting there for a month trying to figure out something. This way we get to let the songs breathe a bit."

The opening track, "Welcome to the World", is musically similar to "Hello There" from the band's 1977 album In Color, but with a different rhythm. "Come On, Come On, Come On" was lyrically redone by Zander. Nielsen describes "One More" as a song for "every addict of everything", adding "I need one more day or one more hour, give me another cigarette, give me one more drink, dope, sex, whatever. I think the chorus is kind of cool." "Dream the Night Away" originally stemmed from an idea of Tom Petersson. Speaking of the closing track "Decaf", Nielsen revealed the lyrical meaning: "Well, don't get too wound up. "Hey buddy, take some decaf."

"O' Claire" bears a similar title to the 1978 album track "Oh Claire" from the Heaven Tonight album. Nielsen revealed in 2006 that it was a song he wrote a long time ago and had always wanted to finish. Nielsen performed the intro vocals, to which he joked: "It's tough, I had to do it 5000 times to make it sound that bad; Robin could do it in two seconds. But it's the emotion of... you know "World's Greatest Lover," with me singing? I'm nowhere near as good a singer as Robin, but I just have a different emotion to it. That was the only song that was kind of old [on the album]."

Critical reception

The album was praised by both fans and critics, considering it a return to form for Cheap Trick. Rolling Stone magazine even declared Rockford one of the best rock albums of 2006.

Stephen Thomas Erlewine of AllMusic stated:

Track listing

Singles
All singles were promotional singles only for radio stations.
 (2006) "Perfect Stranger"
 (2006) "If It Takes a Lifetime"
 (2006) "Come On, Come On, Come On" (US).

Outtakes
 "Mondo Ragga" (Vocal Version)
 "What's In It For You" (Re-worked and re-recorded as "Alive" for the following album "The Latest")
 "Every Single Girl" (Instrumental)

These tracks were released on a promotional-only sampler titled Works In Progress in 2005, and the disc also contained alternate/unfinished versions of various album tracks from Rockford.

Personnel

Cheap Trick
 Robin Zander – vocals, additional guitar, keyboards
 Rick Nielsen – guitars, keyboards, backing vocals
 Tom Petersson – bass guitars, additional guitar, backing vocals
 Bun E. Carlos – drums, backing vocals

Additional musicians
 Damon Fox – keyboards (track 2)
 Kim Bullard – keyboards (track 3)
 Robin Taylor Zander (R. Zander's son) – backing vocals (track 3)
 Jack Douglas – shaker

Technical
 Cheap Trick – producers (all tracks except track 2)
 Linda Perry – producer (track 2)
 Jim "Pinky Beeman, Julian Raymond, Jack Douglas, Steve Albini, Chris Shaw – co-producers
 Bryan Cook, Chris Shaw, Jack Douglas, Jim "Pinky" Beeman, Jimmy Johnson, Linda Perry, Roger Moutenot, Steve Albini, Steve Thompson, Tommy Jamin – engineers
 Andrew Chavez, Bill Synan, Eric Hunter, Kevin Churko, Mike Mang, Tommy Jamin – assistant engineers
 Richie "Britley" Hughes – art direction
 John Johnson – cover art

Charts

References

Cheap Trick albums
2006 albums
Albums produced by Steve Albini
Culture of Rockford, Illinois
Albums produced by Julian Raymond